The Symphony No. 10, Op. 382, is a work for orchestra by French composer Darius Milhaud. The piece was written in 1960 for the hundredth anniversary of the U.S. state of Oregon.

Milhaud's Tenth Symphony is a four-movement work with a total running time of about 24–25 minutes. The titles of the movements, as descriptive of their character as of tempo, are as follows:
 Décidé (approx. 5'00")
 Expressif (approx. 9'30")
 Fantasque (approx. 4'40")
 Emporté (approx. 5'00")

This symphony is published by Heugel & Cie. Recordings of this symphony include a 1995 all-digital recording by Alun Francis and the Radio-Sinfonieorchester Basel, part of a boxed set of Milhaud's Symphonies No. 1-12 on CPO.

References

External links 
Video - Darius Milhaud - Symphony No. 10 (1 of 2) (14:53).
Video - Darius Milhaud - Symphony No. 10 (2 of 2) (10:03).

Symphony 10
1960 compositions
Music of Oregon